Lallé may refer to:

Lallé, Bazèga, Burkina Faso
Lallé, Boulkiemdé, Burkina Faso
Lallé, Ganzourgou, Burkina Faso